Statistics of Úrvalsdeild in the 1958 season.

Overview
It was contested by 6 teams, and ÍA won the championship. ÍA's Þórður Þórðarson was the top scorer with 10 goals, the first time a player reached double digits in the Úrvalsdeild. This was the final season where single round would decide the championship

League standings

Results

References

Úrvalsdeild karla (football) seasons
Iceland
Iceland
Urvalsdeild